Itō Mancio (Itō Mansho, 伊東 マンショ, c.1569 – 13 November 1612) was a Japanese Jesuit, head of the Tenshō embassy; the first Japanese diplomatic mission to Europe, and a Catholic priest.

Early life 
He was born in Hyūga Province, Tonokōri (now Saito, Miyazaki) to a noble family in 1569. His official birthname was Itō Sukemasu (伊東 祐益). His father was Itō Sukeharu (伊東祐青) and his mother was Machinoue (町の上) the daughter of daimyo Itō Yoshisuke. He was a member of the Itō clan.

Career 

Itō Mancio studied theology and Latin at the seminary in Nagasaki. As leader of the Tenshō embassy (1582–90) he traveled to Europe where he met Popes Gregory XIII and Sixtus V in Rome.

The idea of sending a Japanese embassy to Europe was originally conceived by the Jesuit Alessandro Valignano. and sponsored by the Christian daimyō Ōtomo Sōrin, Ōmura Sumitada and Arima Harunobu. Itō Sukemasu was placed at the head of the group by Ōtomo, daimyō of the Bungo Province of Kyūshū and close relative of Sukemasu's father, Itō Shurinosuke.

In 1580 Itō was baptized with the name Mancio (Mansho, マンショ). On February 20, 1582 Itō left Nagasaki in the company of three other nobles: Michele Chijiwa, Giuliano Nakaura and Martino Hara. They were accompanied by two servants and their tutor and interpreter Diego de Mesquita, as well as by Valignano himself, who escorted them to Goa in India before taking on a new post. On the way to Lisbon they spent nine months between Macau, Kochi and Goa. From Lisbon they left for Rome, the main destination of the trip. In Rome Mancio was nominated honorary citizen and adorned with the title of Order of the Golden Spur. During the return journey from Rome they headed for Venice and along the way they stopped for a day in Imola (June 18, 1585). A manuscript was drawn up in their honor and as evidence of the event, which is still preserved in the municipal historical archive of the city.

The ambassadors returned to Japan on 21 July 1590. During their stay in Europe the group met King Philip II of Spain, the Grand Duke of Tuscany Francesco I de 'Medici, Pope Gregory XIII and his successor, Sixtus V.

Later life 
Joining the order of Jesuit priests in 1608. He engaged in missionary work in northwest Japan but soon was expelled from the local Kokura domain and then moved to the Nakatsu Domain. He was finally exiled to Nagasaki and became a teacher at the seminary. Mancio died of an illness in Nagasaki in 1612, at the age of 43.

Portrait 
A portrait depicting Itō Mancio was discovered in 2008 and entrusted to the care of experts who identified its authenticity and attributed its creation to Domenico Tintoretto. The painting, an oil on canvas 53 centimeters high by 43 centimeters wide, depicted a young man with oriental features dressed in the Spanish fashion of the late sixteenth century, with a brown suit, black hat and white ruff. On the back of the work there was the inscription «D. MANSIO NIPOTE DEL RE DI FIGENGA AMB[asciator]E DEL RE FRA[nces]CO BVGNOCINGVA A SUA SAN[tit]A. MCXXCV. DGH 393».

The painting was commissioned by the Senate of Venice to Jacopo Tintoretto in 1585 on the occasion of the passage of the ambassadors in the city. In reality, the portrait was made by his son Domenico, remaining in stock in the Tintorette workshop until the Spanish collector Gaspar Méndez de Haro, Marquis del Carpio, bought the entire collection of the two artists. Due to his debts, however, he was forced to sell all his assets and the work ended up in the hands of the Florentine banker Giovanni Francesco del Rosso who in turn ceded it to the Rinuccini family of Florence. In 1831 Marianna Rinuccini married Giorgio Teodoro Trivulzio bringing as a dowry the portrait of Itō Mancio in the Trivulzio collection in Milan.

The painting was restored in 2009 and exhibited in Tokyo, Nagasaki and Miyazaki (Mancio's place of origin) on the occasion of the celebrations of the 150th anniversary of the beginning of diplomatic relations between Italy and Japan in 2016.

See also
Hasekura Tsunenaga

References

Bibliography
 C. R. Boxer: The Christian Century in Japan 1549-1650. Carcanet Press, 

Primary sources

Secondary sources

 Estratto dal libro di 

1569 births
1612 deaths
Japanese Roman Catholics
Japanese Roman Catholic missionaries
Roman Catholic missionaries in Japan
Members of the Tenshō embassy